Le Tignet is a commune in the Alpes-Maritimes department in the Provence-Alpes-Côte d'Azur region of south-eastern France.

The inhabitants of the commune are known as Tignétans.

Population

See also
Communes of the Alpes-Maritimes department

References

Communes of Alpes-Maritimes
Alpes-Maritimes communes articles needing translation from French Wikipedia